José Carreras Sings Catalan Songs is a 1991 Sony Classical album featuring José Carreras and the orchestra of the Gran Teatre del Liceu conducted by Joan Casas. The songs are more classical lieder than Mi Otro Perfil, an earlier release of Spanish and Catalan songs with Orchestra Zafiro.

Track listing
El Cant dels Ocells
Grieg T'estimo (originally German Ich liebe dich)
Cançó del lladre - Song of the Thief
El testament d'Amelia
Record de Solsona
Rosó from Pel teu amor
Cançó de taverna
Els contrabandistes
El noi de la mare
Frederic Mompou Damunt de tu, només les flors
Maig - May
Cançó de comiat - Song of Farewell
Festeig - Courtship
Cançó de bressol - Lullaby
Cançó de grumet - Cabin boy song
A l'ombra del lledoner - In the shade of the hackberry
Canticel
Cançó incerta
Cançó de passar cantant

References

1991 classical albums
José Carreras albums